P. Karunakaran (born 20 April 1945) is an Indian communist politician and a member of the 16th Lok Sabha of India.
He represented the Kasargod constituency of Kerala and is a member of the Communist Party of India (Marxist) (CPI(M)) political party. He was elected to Lok Sabha for the first time in 2004 general election. He won the second term in 2009 Lok Sabha election. He got 385,522 votes against 321,095 of the Congress(I) candidate. He was the leader of the Loksabha for CPI(M) in the 16th Loksabha.

His wife Laila, is daughter of the communist leader A. K. Gopalan and Susheela Gopalan. He holds an M.A degree from Kerala University.

Books Published
 Memories of Vietnam
 Indian Politics - Inside and Outside Parliament
 Suppression and Resistance
 Indian Politics - Outside and Inside Parliament (Second Part)
 Olimangaroormakal

See also
 Anirudhan Sampath
P. K. Biju
Mohammed Salim

References

External links
 http://india.gov.in/govt/loksabhampdetail.php?mpcode=4178 - Parliament of India website

Communist Party of India (Marxist) politicians from Kerala
Living people
1945 births
India MPs 2004–2009
India MPs 2009–2014
Lok Sabha members from Kerala
India MPs 2014–2019
People from Kasaragod district
Politicians from Thiruvananthapuram